Kalamandalam Prabhakaran is an Indian dancer.

Early life 
He hails from the family of late Malabar Raman Nair, who made priceless contributions towards the aesthetic enhancement of Thullal as a performing art. He was born in 1945 to Makkamma and Kunjambu Nair. He was inspired by his paternal uncle Malabar Raman Nair and left conventional academic studies. In 1964, he completed the diploma course in Thullal, at the Kerala Kalamandalam, under the Kalamandalam Divakaran Nair and Vadakkan Kannan Nair. Later he mastered all the basic lessons in Baratanatyam under the tutelage of Natanam Sivapal and in Parayan Thullall, under Vechur Thakamani Pillai.

Career 
Thullal Thrayam is an experiment combining three traditional art forms led by Kalamandalam Prabhakan. Thullal Thrayam' combined three classical thullal art forms - Ottan Thullal, Seethankan Thullal and Parayan Thullal.

Award
 1996 – Kerala Sangeetha Nataka Akademi Award

References

Living people
1945 births
Performers of Indian classical dance
Recipients of the Kerala Sangeetha Nataka Akademi Award